is a museum of local history in Hokuto, Hokkaidō, Japan that came into being after the city's formation in 2006. The museum is successor to the former , which had a collection of some five thousand items with a focus on agriculture, as Ōno is where rice-farming was brought to Hokkaidō. The collection of Hokuto City Hometown Museum includes artefacts from Yafurai-date that have been designated a Prefectural Tangible Cultural Property.

See also
 List of Cultural Properties of Japan - archaeological materials (Hokkaidō)
 List of Cultural Properties of Japan - historical materials (Hokkaidō)
 Matsumae Town Historical Museum
 Hakodate City Museum
 Hakodate City Museum
 List of Historic Sites of Japan (Hokkaidō)

References

External links
  Hokuto City Hometown Museum 

Museums in Hokkaido
Hokuto, Hokkaido
History museums in Japan
Museums established in 2006
2006 establishments in Japan